Nymphaeum or Nymphaion was a harbour town of ancient Laconia between Boeae and Cape Malea. It had a statue of Poseidon standing, and a cave close to the sea; in it was a spring of sweet water. Its district was reported by Pausanias (2nd century) to be well populated.

Its site is tentatively located near the modern Ag. Marina.

References

Populated places in ancient Laconia
Former populated places in Greece